Mansoor Rana, (born 27 December 1962) is a former Pakistani cricketer who played two One Day Internationals.  Despite scoring more than 12,000 runs in first-class cricket, he was unable to break into his country's Test cricket side, due to the presence of Javed Miandad, Salim Malik and others. He is now one cricket coach in Pakistan and currently a manager with the Pakistan Cricket Team.

Rana is the son of former Pakistani cricket umpire Shakoor Rana and brother of Maqsood Rana. Azmat Rana was his uncle.

He started coaching later in his career, under his coaching Pakistan under19 won the World Cup in 2006 in Sri Lanka. Later, he was appointed as head coach of the Pakistan's Women Team that won the gold medal in the 2010 Asian games. On September 16, 2019, he was announced as team Team Operations, Logistics & Administrative Manager manager of Pakistan men's cricket team.

References 

1962 births
Living people
Punjabi people
Pakistan One Day International cricketers
Pakistani cricketers
Bahawalpur cricketers
Pakistan Railways cricketers
Cricketers from Lahore
Zarai Taraqiati Bank Limited cricketers
Lahore City cricketers
Lahore City A cricketers
Lahore City Whites cricketers
Lahore City Blues cricketers
Pakistani cricket coaches